Eskimo dog might refer to:
 A dog owned by a person of Eskimo (Yupik, Inuit or Aleut) ancestry
 Any Arctic sled dog type, long haired dogs used for pulling sleds
 Canadian Eskimo Dog, a selectively bred dog breed registered with the Canadian Kennel Club
 American Eskimo Dog, a breed of companion dog originating in Germany
 Greenland Dog, also known as Esquimaux Dog